Jornal O Clarim, is a trilingual (Portuguese-English-Chinese) weekly newspaper based in Macau, owned by the Diocese Macau, the oldest continuous Portuguese newspaper in Macau (GCS registration no.1)

Its head office is in Rua Formosa (美麗街) in Sé.

References

External links
 O Clarim in English

Newspapers published in Macau
Multilingual news services
Weekly newspapers